In geometry, a space-filling polyhedron is a polyhedron that can be used to fill all of three-dimensional space via translations, rotations and/or reflections, where filling means that; taken together, all the instances of the polyhedron constitute a partition of three-space. Any periodic tiling or honeycomb of three-space can in fact be generated by translating a primitive cell polyhedron.

Any parallelepiped tessellates Euclidian 3-space, and more specifically any of five parallelohedra such as the rhombic dodecahedron, which is one of nine edge-transitive and face-transitive solids. Examples of other space-filling polyhedra include the set of five convex polyhedra with regular faces, which include the triangular prism, hexagonal prism, gyrobifastigium, cube, and truncated octahedron; a set that intersects with that of the five parallelohedra.

An example of a study relating to space-filling polyhedrons is the Weaire–Phelan structure. 

The Cube is the only platonic solid that can fill space independently, although tiling space using tetrahedrons and octahedrons is possible.

If the shape of a regular lattice is converted into a prism of the same base.
triangular prisms from triangles.
cubes (or in this case square prisms) from squares.
hexagonal prisms from hexagons.
It is possible to have a filled 3-dimensional space by layering lattices on top of one another.

References
 Space-Filling Polyhedron, MathWorld